This article lists candidates at the 2006 South Australian state election.

Retiring MPs

Labor
Ron Roberts MLC

Liberal
Dean Brown MP (Finniss)
Mark Brindal MP (Unley)
Dorothy Kotz MP (Newland) 
Wayne Matthew MP (Bright) 
John Meier MP (Goyder)
Julian Stefani MLC

Democrats

Ian Gilfillan MLC

House of Assembly
Sitting members are shown in bold text. Successful candidates are highlighted in the relevant colour. Where there is possible confusion, an asterisk (*) is also used.

Legislative Council
Sitting members are shown in bold text. Tickets that elected at least one MLC are highlighted in the relevant colour. Successful candidates are identified by an asterisk (*). Eleven seats were up for election. Labor were defending four seats. The Liberals were defending four seats. The Democrats were defending two seats. No Pokies were defending one seat.

References

2006 elections in Australia
Candidates for South Australian state elections
2000s in South Australia